The 1971–72 Chicago Black Hawks season was the club's 46th season in the National Hockey League, and their second consecutive first-place finish in the NHL West, with 46 victories and 107 points. In the 1972 playoffs, the Black Hawks swept the Pittsburgh Penguins in the quarter-finals before being swept by the New York Rangers in the semi-finals.

Regular season
Chicago had an excellent start to the season, winning their opening five games, and never let up throughout the season, as they had an unbeaten streak of ten games in December to take control of the West Division.  The Black Hawks finish the season with a twelve-game unbeaten streak to win their third straight divisional title, with a record of 46–17–15, tying the club record with 107 points that was set during the 1970–71 season.  The Black Hawks finished 21 points ahead of the second place Minnesota North Stars.

Offensively, the Black Hawks were led by Bobby Hull, who scored a team high 50 goals and 93 points, which placed him seventh in league scoring.  Hull also led the club with a +54 rating. Pit Martin led the club with 51 assists, and finished second in team scoring with 75 points.  Dennis Hull had 30 goals and 69 points, while Stan Mikita was just behind him with 26 goals and 65 points.  On defense, Pat Stapleton led the club with 41 points, while Bill White and Doug Jarrett each had 29 points.  Keith Magnuson led the team in penalty minutes, as he accumulated 201.

In goal, Tony Esposito led the club with 31 victories and a 1.77 goals against average, along with nine shutouts while appearing in 48 games.  Backup goaltender Gary Smith won 14 games with a 2.42 goals against average and five shutouts.  They helped the team have a league low 166 goals against, and were awarded the Vezina Trophy for their efforts.

Season standings

Game log

Playoffs
The Hawks opened the playoffs against the Pittsburgh Penguins, who had a record of 26–38–14, earning 66 points, while placing fourth in the West Division.  The series opened with two games at Chicago Stadium, and the Black Hawks, who had a record of 28–3–8 at home, continued their dominance, as they defeated the Penguins 3–1 and 3–2 to take a 2–0 series lead.  The series moved to the Pittsburgh Civic Arena for the next two games, however, it was the Black Hawks who continued to stay hot, as they shutout the Penguins 2–0 in the third game, and finished off the series sweep with a 6–5 overtime win in the fourth game.

Chicago's next opponent was the New York Rangers, who had finished the season with a 48–17–13 record, earning 109 points, and a second-place finish in the East Division.  The Rangers defeated the defending Stanley Cup champions, the Montreal Canadiens in their first playoff series.  Since the Black Hawks won their division, they were given home ice advantage in the series.  The series opened up with two games at Chicago Stadium, however, it was the Rangers who struck first, defeating the Hawks 3–2, then taking the second game in Chicago by a score of 5–3 to take an early 2–0 series lead.  Chicago could not get themselves back in the series, as New York won the third game 3–2, and the Rangers completed the sweep of the Black Hawks with a 6–2 thumping in the fourth game.

Chicago Black Hawks 4, Pittsburgh Penguins 0

New York Rangers 4, Chicago Black Hawks 0

Player stats

Regular season
Scoring leaders

Goaltending

Playoffs
Scoring leaders

Goaltending

Transactions

Draft picks
Chicago's draft picks at the 1971 NHL Amateur Draft held at the Queen Elizabeth Hotel in Montreal, Quebec.

Farm teams

See also
1971–72 NHL season

References

Sources
Hockey-Reference
Rauzulu's Street
Goalies Archive
HockeyDB
National Hockey League Guide & Record Book 2007

Chicago Blackhawks seasons
Chicago
Chicago